Valeriy Hryshyn (born 12 June 1994) is a Ukrainian footballer who plays as a striker for Cambodian Premier League club Phnom Penh Crown.

Club career
Hryshyn is a product of youth team systems of FC Shakhtar Donetsk. From February 2015 he played on loan for FC Illichivets.

He made his début in the Ukrainian Premier League for FC Hoverla Uzhhorod in the game against FC Metalurh Zaporizhya  on 1 March 2015.

in 2019, he signed for Sheikh Russel KC in the Bangladesh Premier League and played there before moving to Cambodian side Phnom Penh Crown.

Honours

Club
Phnom Penh Crown
Cambodian Premier League: 2021, 2022 
Cambodian Super Cup: 2022
Cambodian League Cup: 2022

References

External links

1994 births
Living people
Ukrainian footballers
Association football forwards
FC Shakhtar Donetsk players
FC Mariupol players
FC Hoverla Uzhhorod players
Ukrainian Premier League players
People from Lyman, Ukraine
FC Metalist Kharkiv players
FC Kramatorsk players
Expatriate footballers in Bangladesh
Phnom Penh Crown FC players
Expatriate footballers in Cambodia
Ukraine youth international footballers
Sportspeople from Donetsk Oblast